Lee Habeeb is an American talk radio executive, host, podcaster and essayist. He is the Vice President of Content for the Salem Media Group and is the founder of American Private Radio, and the creator, founder and host of "Our American Stories," a weekday radio show syndicated across the U.S.

Habeeb has written columns for USA Today, The Washington Examiner, the National Review, and LifeZette. He currently writes a weekly essay for Newsweek.

Habeeb graduated from the University of Virginia School of Law (Class of 1991).  Since 2006, he's lived in Oxford, Mississippi with his wife, Valerie, and daughter, Reagan.

Our American Stories 
Lee Habeeb is the host and founder of Our American Stories, a storytelling radio show and podcast featuring stories that represent the best of America: history, sports, music, free enterprise, charity, faith, family and more. It can be heard 5 days a week, two hours a night, on over 220 affiliates across the country. Archives of the show are available free on Apple Podcasts.

On August 2, 2021, Our American Stories was signed to a syndication deal with Premiere Networks, a subsidiary of iHeartMedia.

Habeeb was ranked 12th in Talkers Magazine 2022 Heavy Hundred (100 Most Important Radio Talk Show Hosts in America). Ranked in the 30th and 14th position in 2020 and 2021, respectively, Habeeb has dramatically moved up the ladder during the three-year period.

References

External links

Living people
American radio producers
People from Teaneck, New Jersey
American people of Lebanese descent
University of Virginia School of Law alumni
American people of Italian descent
People from Oxford, Mississippi
Year of birth missing (living people)
Radio personalities from Mississippi
Radio personalities from New Jersey